Jahanabad-e Maleki (also Romanized as Jahānābād-e Malekī; also known as Jahānābād) is a village in Qaleh Hamam Rural District, Salehabad County, Razavi Khorasan Province, Iran. At the 2006 census, its population was 507, in 105 families.

References 

Populated places in   Torbat-e Jam County